John Best may refer to:

Politicians
John Best (died 1560), MP for Westminster
 John Best (died 1574), in 1553 MP for Colchester
 John Best (politician, born 1821) (1821–1865), British politician
 John Best (Canadian politician) (1861–1923), Australian-born politician in Canada

Sports
 John Best (basketball) (born 1971), American basketball player
 Johnny Best (boxer), 1940s Australian middleweight boxer
 John Best (soccer) (1940–2014), US/English soccer defender
 John Orr Best (1910–1996), American soccer referee and member of the National Soccer Hall of Fame

Others
 John Best (bishop) (died 1570), Bishop of Carlisle 1560–1570
 John Best (guard captain), 1592–1597 Captain of the Yeomen of the Guard
 John C. Best (1865–1902), Canadian murderer
 John William Best (1912–2000), Royal Air Force pilot
 Johnny Best (1913–2003), American jazz trumpeter